Mária Földes (5 September 1925 – 21 August 1976) was a Hungarian-Romanian playwright. After surviving several Nazi concentration camps during 1944-1945 in World War II, including Auschwitz, she returned to Romania, where she studied drama and theater arts.  Writing several plays in Hungarian, she is also known for her memoir, The Stroll (1974), published in Hungarian and in Hebrew (1975). It was adapted as a one-woman play by the same name, and received productions in Yiddish and English during the late 1970s, including in the United States.

Early life and education 
Mária Földes was born to a Jewish Hungarian family in Arad, Romania on 5 September 1925.  She grew up speaking Hungarian and did well in school. In May 1944 during World War II, the Nazi occupiers forced the country to collect the Jews into the Cluj ghetto.  Then in her last year of secondary school, Földes at the age of 18 and her mother were deported some time during May–June 1944 from the ghetto to Poland, together with more than 16,000 other Romanian Jews. They were shifted from one Nazi concentration camp to another, passing through at least six or seven before ending at Auschwitz. Her mother died there.

Career
After the war, Földes finally made her way back to Romania.  She studied drama at the Szentgyorgy Istvan Academy of Dramatic Art in Târgu Mureş.  She soon began writing plays.

Földes wrote and published several plays:

 Weekdays
 The Demoiselle in the Barracks
 The Accident on Street Number Nine
 The Seventh is the Traitor
 The Inheritance
 Short is the Summer

With the exception of the last one, the plays were collected and published in a 1968 book titled “The Seventh is the Traitor”. In 1974 Földes published her memoir, “The Stroll”, in Hungarian in Bucharest. That same year Földes left Romania because of continuing antisemitism and Communist repression of intellectuals, and emigrated to Israel with her daughter.

Marriage and family
Földes had married, and she and her husband had a daughter, Agnes Lev.

Israel
Földes published a few short stories in various Israeli newspapers, but at age 49 she found it difficult to work in a new country and under a new language.  In 1975 her memoir The Stroll was published in a Hebrew translation.

Suffering from depression, Földes committed suicide in 1976.  Her daughter Agnes Lev worked with the actress Baatsheva to adapt her mother's memoir for the stage.  They wrote a one-woman show, starring Baatsheva, which was produced at the Habima Theatre. She received the Kinor David (David's Harp Prize for her performance.

The play toured in Yiddish and English productions. It was performed in the United States in 1977 or 1978. Földes' memoir was adapted in Hungary as a radio dramatization, produced in Budapest about 1985.

References

1925 births
1976 deaths
Hungarian Jews
People from Arad, Romania
Romanian Jews
Auschwitz concentration camp survivors
Nazi-era ghetto inmates
20th-century Romanian women writers
1976 suicides